George Coolidge Hunting (22 October 1871 – 6 February 1924) was missionary bishop of the Episcopal Diocese of Nevada 1914 to 1924.

Biography
Hunting was born on October 22, 1871, in West Milwaukee, Wisconsin. He was elected Missionary Bishop of Nevada in 1914. During his episcopacy he revived a number of churches in the mining towns of Eureka, Nevada, Virginia City, Nevada, and Austin, Nevada. He acquired property for missions in promising agricultural areas. He married Mary Grace Pullman in 1894. He was also cousin of President Calvin Coolidge. Hunting succumbed to pneumonia and died on February 6, 1924.

References

1871 births
1924 deaths
20th-century Anglican bishops in the United States
Episcopal bishops of Nevada
People from West Milwaukee, Wisconsin